Vitiligo-associated multiple autoimmune disease susceptibility 6 is a protein that in humans is encoded by the VAMAS6 gene.

References

Further reading 

Human genes
Human proteins